James Herrick may refer to:

James A. Herrick (born 1954), American professor of communication
James B. Herrick (1861–1954), American doctor
Jim Herrick (born 1944), British humanist and secularist

See also
Jim Harrick (born 1938), American basketball coach